The Faculty of Engineering and Science at Aalborg University is one of five faculties at AAU. Research at the Faculty of Engineering and Science (ENGINEERING) is wide-ranging, spanning from basic to application-oriented research that can solve the major global societal challenges. Areas include: converting to green energy, ensuring clean water for the world's population, and smart and innovative methods of production. Research at the faculty is conducted by six departments, each within their core area as well as collaboratively across areas and with other national and international research institutions in order to achieve the best results.

The departments are:

The Built Environment (BUILD)
Materials and Production
Chemistry and Bioscience
Mathematical Sciences
Energy Technology

Internationally, the faculty distinguishes itself with high placement on a number of reputable rankings of the world's universities. These include AAU being fourth best engineering university according to U.S. News & World Report "Best Global Universities" 2020. Regarding education, Aalborg University is also ranked as one of the World's best universities to educate within the field of engineering. According to the MIT report "The Global state of the art in engineering education, 2018", Aalborg University ranks ad best in Europe and fourth best ind the world for engineering programs.

The programs under The Faculty of Engineering and Science conducted in English 
Indoor Environmental and Energy Engineering, civilingeniør
Structural and Civil Engineering, civilingeniør
Water and Environmental Engineering, civilingeniør
Structural Design and Analysis, civilingeniør
Building Energy Design
Risk and Safety Management
Geography
Applied Industrial Electronics
Energy Engineering
Sustainable Energy Engineering
Advanced Power Electronics
Intelligent Reliable Systems
Entrepreneurial Engineering (Forretningsinnovation)
Management Engineering (Prduktionsledelse)
Materials and Nanotechnology (Materiale- og Nanoteknologi)
Mechanical Engineering (Mekanik og Produktion)
Nanobiotechnology

External links 
Faculty of Engineering and Science website

Aalborg University
Engineering universities and colleges in Denmark